Kirk Harris is an actor-filmmaker who has been the lead actor in several films that have had arthouse theatrical releases in the U.S. He starred in the 2013 western thriller A Sierra Nevada Gunfight (originally titled The Sorrow) by director Vernon Mortensen. The film was shot in the mountains of Eastern San Diego county. The film was written by Mortensen and Johnny Harrington. He also starred in The Kid: Chamaco, which was shot in Mexico City by Mexican director/producer Miguel Necoechea. The film was written by Harris, Necoechea and Canadian filmmaker Carl Bessai. A former amateur boxer, Harris played a boxer on-screen for the first time. The film made its United States premiere at the 2010 Palm Springs International Film Festival. The film premiered in theatres in late 2010 and was chosen as a Critics Pick for the New York Times, Chicago Tribune, and Los Angeles Times.

Harris' credits include: The Violent Kind, Intoxicating, Hard Luck, My Sweet Killer, and Harris' own directorial debut, Loser (1996; with Peta Wilson). He was awarded the Best Breakthrough Performance Winner at the Method Fest Film Festival. As a writer, Harris has had five of his screenplays make it to the screen. He also founded Rogue Arts, a film distribution and production company, whose titles include: Three Days of Rain, Flickering Lights, and Con Man''.

References

External links

Kirk Harris' biodata
Fairway Film Alliance website 
Press Enterprise "Boxing Film premiere brings San Bernardino native back to the IE"
San Bernardino Sun
Desert Sun
Los Angeles Times Review "Chamaco (The Kid)"
Los Angeles Times

American male film actors
American male screenwriters
Year of birth missing (living people)
Living people
Actors from San Bernardino, California
Screenwriters from California